This article is the Electoral history of John Turner, the seventeenth Prime Minister of Canada.

A liberal, Turner served one term as Prime Minister (June 30 to September 17, 1984), as successor to Pierre Trudeau. He had the second shortest-tenure of office of all the prime ministers, with only Charles Tupper having a shorter term.  Like Tupper, he never sat in Parliament while he was prime minister.

Turner led the Liberal Party of Canada in two general elections (1984) and (1988), and lost both to Brian Mulroney. He resigned the party leadership following the 1988 general election, and was succeeded by Jean Chrétien.

Turner stood for election to the House of Commons of Canada eight times and was elected each time.

Turner stood for election as leader of the Liberal Party twice.  He lost in 1968 to Pierre Trudeau, but he won in 1984, becoming Trudeau's successor as Liberal leader.  He beat Jean Chrétien in the 1984 convention, but was eventually succeeded by Chrétien after the 1988 election loss.

Summary 

Turner ranks twenty-second out of twenty-three prime ministers for time in office, serving one term of 79 days. Only Charles Tupper had a shorter term, of 68 days in office.  Like Tupper, Turner never sat in the House of Commons as prime minister.

Turner is the first of two prime ministers from British Columbia, the other being Kim Campbell.

A lawyer, Turner got involved in politics at an early age. He was first elected to the House of Commons at age 33, in the federal election of 1962.  He was appointed to Cabinet by Prime Minister Lester Pearson (1965 to 1968) and then by Prime Minister Pierre Trudeau (1968 to 1975).  He resigned from Cabinet in 1975 and returned to private practice of law.

Turner had contested the Liberal Party leadership in 1968 when Pearson retired, but was defeated by Trudeau, who became prime minister.  When Trudeau announced his retirement in 1984, Turner again entered the leadership contest.  This time he won, defeating Jean Chrétien.

Turner led the Liberals in two general elections (1984) and (1988).  Following his election as party leader in 1984, Turner called a general election.  The Liberals were defeated by Brian Mulroney, going from government to opposition.  Brian Mulroney won the largest majority in the Commons (in number of seats) in Canadian history, and the Liberals won only ten more seats than the third party, the New Democratic Party.  Turner became Leader of the Official Opposition.  In 1988, he again led the Liberals. While they were again defeated by Mulroney, under Turner's leadership they more than doubled their seats in the Commons, outstripping the NDP to remain the dominant second party.

Turner never sat as prime minister in the House of Commons, because he was not a member of the Commons when he was elected leader of the Liberal Party.  In the 1984 general election, he won a seat in the Commons, but Parliament was not recalled until after the change in government.  Turner then sat in Commons as Leader of the Opposition.  He is only the second prime minister who never sat in Parliament as prime minister, the other being Charles Tupper.

Turner stood for election to the Commons eight times:  three times from Montreal (St. Lawrence—St. George), three times from Ottawa (Ottawa–Carleton), and twice from Vancouver (Vancouver Quadra).  He was elected all eight times.  He served a total of 22 years, 9 months, 17 days in the House of Commons.

After his second general election defeat, Turner resigned as leader of the Liberal Party in 1990, being succeeded by Chrétien.  He continued to sit in the Commons until the 1993 election, when he retired from politics.

Federal general elections: 1984 and 1988 

Turner led the Liberal Party in two general elections (1984) and (1988).  He lost both times to Brian Mulroney.

Federal election, 1984 

In his first election as leader, Turner led the Liberals to a major defeat, winning only forty seats in the Commons.  Mulroney won the largest majority (in seat numbers) in Canadian history.

1 Leader of the Opposition when election was called;  Prime Minister after election.
2 Prime Minister when election was called;  Leader of the Opposition after the election.
3 Table does not include parties which received votes but did not elect any members.

Federal election, 1988 

In his second general election as leader, Turner doubled the Liberal Party standings in the House of Commons, but remained in Opposition.

1 Prime Minister when election was called;  Prime Minister after election.
2 Leader of the Opposition when election was called;  Leader of the Opposition after the election.
3 Table does not include parties which received votes but did not elect any members.

Federal constituency elections:  1962 to 1974;  1984 and 1988 

Turner stood for election to the House of Commons eight times.  He was elected each time.

1962 Federal Election: St. Lawrence–St. George 

 Elected. 
X Incumbent.
1 Rounding error.

1963 Federal Election: St. Lawrence–St. George 

 Elected. 
X Incumbent.

1965 Federal Election: St. Lawrence–St. George 

 Elected. 
X Incumbent.
1 Rounding error.

The constituency of St. Lawrence–St. George was abolished in the 1968 re-distribution.

1968 Federal Election: Ottawa—Carleton, Ontario 

 Elected.

1972 Federal Election: Ottawa—Carleton, Ontario 

 Elected. 
X Incumbent.

1974 Federal Election: Ottawa—Carleton, Ontario 

 Elected. 
X Incumbent.

1984 Federal Election: Vancouver Quadra, British Columbia 

 Elected. 
X Incumbent.
1 Less than 0.1%.
2 Rounding error.

1988 Federal Election: Vancouver Quadra, British Columbia 

 Elected. 
X Incumbent.
1 Less than 0.1%.
2 Rounding error.

Liberal Party Leadership Conventions:  1968, 1984 

Turner contested the leadership of the Liberal Party twice.  In 1968, he lost to Trudeau, but in the 1984 convention he won the leadership, becoming Trudeau's successor as Liberal leader and prime minister.

1968 Leadership Convention 

Turner entered the leadership contest as the youngest candidate.  He eventually lost on the fourth ballot to Trudeau, coming in third place after Trudeau and Robert Winters, a former minister in Pearson's government.

1 Rounding error.

1984 Leadership Convention 

Trudeau announced his retirement early in 1984.  Turner entered the leadership election and won on the second ballot.  His main opposition was Jean Chrétien, who came in second.

See also 

 Electoral history of Pierre Trudeau - Turner's predecessor as leader of the Liberal Party and as Prime Minister.
 Electoral history of Brian Mulroney - Turner's successor as Prime Minister.
 Electoral history of Jean Chrétien - Turner's successor as leader of the Liberal Party.

References

External links 

 Library of Parliament:  History of Federal Ridings Since 1867
 CPAC - 1968 Liberal Convention
 CPAC – 1984 Liberal Convention

Turner, John